Mladen Žganjer (born 17 May 1966) is a Croatian professional football coach and former player. He currently serves as a goalkeeping coach for the Iran national football team under head coach Dragan Skočić.

Career
Born in Rijeka, as a goalkeeper he spent much of his career with HNK Rijeka, playing in both the Yugoslav First League and Prva HNL. During the 1993-94 Prva HNL season he did not concede a goal for 622 minutes, making him the club's record holder in top tier competitions. Before finishing his career, he played for SV Spittal in Austria, before returning to Croatia, where he played for NK Pomorac Kostrena.

Career statistics

References

1966 births
Living people
Footballers from Rijeka
Association football goalkeepers
Yugoslav footballers
Croatian footballers
HNK Orijent players
HNK Rijeka players
SV Spittal players
NK Pomorac 1921 players
Yugoslav First League players
Croatian Football League players
2. Liga (Austria) players
Croatian expatriate footballers
Expatriate footballers in Austria
Croatian expatriate sportspeople in Austria
HNK Rijeka non-playing staff
Association football goalkeeping coaches